Qıraqlı or Kyragly or Kyrakhly or Kragly may refer to:
Qıraqlı, Khachmaz, Azerbaijan
Qıraqlı, Saatly, Azerbaijan